Albin Runesson (born April 15, 1996) is a Swedish ice hockey defenceman. He is currently playing with Modo Hockey of the HockeyAllsvenskan (Allsv).

Runesson made his Swedish Hockey League debut playing with Modo Hockey during the 2014–15 SHL season.

References

External links

1996 births
Living people
Modo Hockey players
Mora IK players
Swedish ice hockey defencemen
Timrå IK players